Jennings-Brown House is a historic home located at Bennettsville, Marlboro County, South Carolina. It was built about 1830, and is a two-story, frame dwelling with a full-width one-story front porch.  It was one of the first houses built after Bennettsville became the Marlboro County seat in 1819.  During the American Civil War, it served as headquarters for Major General Frank P. Blair, commanding general of the U.S.A. XVII Army Corps, which captured and occupied Bennettsville on March 6–7, 1865.

It was listed on the National Register of Historic Places in 1972.

References 

Houses on the National Register of Historic Places in South Carolina
Houses completed in 1830
Houses in Marlboro County, South Carolina
National Register of Historic Places in Marlboro County, South Carolina
1830 establishments in South Carolina